Barczewko  is a village in the administrative district of Gmina Barczewo, within Olsztyn County, Warmian-Masurian Voivodeship, in northern Poland.

The village grew up around a fortification founded by vogt Friedrich von Liebenzelle. The village is mentioned in written sources for the first time on 26 December 1329. In the winter of 1353-54 the village was destroyed by Lithuanian troops. It was later rebuilt but further to the east of the original location. The village church dates from 1582.

The village has a population of 1,050.

Link 

 Kreisgemeinschaft Allenstein-Land e.V. Kirchspiel Alt Wartenburg

References

Barczewko